Bernard McLeod (born 16 August 1953) is a Trinidadian cricketer. He played in 28 first-class matches for Trinidad and Tobago from 1971 to 1980.

See also
 List of Trinidadian representative cricketers

References

External links
 

1953 births
Living people
Trinidad and Tobago cricketers